
Gmina Łabunie is a rural gmina (administrative district) in Zamość County, Lublin Voivodeship, in eastern Poland.

Villages
Gmina Łabunie contains the villages and settlements of Barchaczów, Bródek, Dąbrowa, Łabunie, Łabunie-Reforma, Łabuńki Drugie, Łabuńki Pierwsze, Majdan Ruszowski, Mocówka, Ruszów, Ruszów-Kolonia, Wierzbie and Wólka Łabuńska.

Neighbouring gminas
Gmina Łabunie is bordered by the gminas of Adamów, Komarów-Osada, Krynice, Sitno and Zamość.

References

Polish official population figures 2006

Labunie
Zamość County